Andrew Johnstone McCall (12 October 1911 – 5 November 1979) was a Scottish football player and manager.

Career
Andy McCall played for Ayr United, St Johnstone, Huddersfield Town, Nottingham Forest and Dundee and was later a coach at Dens Park for several years. McCall was appointed Dundee United manager in October 1958, following the resignation of Tommy Gray. Under his charge, United dropped to third bottom of Division Two and McCall resigned at the end of the season after six months in charge.

References
 

1911 births
1979 deaths
Scottish footballers
Scottish football managers
Scottish Football League players
English Football League players
Association football inside forwards
Association football wing halves
Ayr United F.C. players
St Johnstone F.C. players
St Johnstone F.C. wartime guest players
Aberdeen F.C. wartime guest players
Clyde F.C. wartime guest players
Third Lanark A.C. wartime guest players
Huddersfield Town A.F.C. players
Nottingham Forest F.C. players
Dundee F.C. players
Dundee United F.C. managers
People from Cumnock
Cumnock Juniors F.C. players
Scottish Junior Football Association players
Scottish Football League managers
Footballers from East Ayrshire